Stožerni general (literally "Staff General", usually translated as "General of the army") is the highest rank in the Croatian Army and the Croatian Air Force branches of the Armed Forces of Croatia. It corresponds to Admiral flote ("Admiral of the fleet") rank used in the Croatian Navy.

Stožerni general corresponds to other five-star ranks in other militaries, and is designated as code OF-10 according to NATO rank classification.

People awarded the rank
A total of six men have attained this rank since the foundation of the Croatian Armed Forces in 1991, none of whom have been in active duty since 2005.

† Gojko Šušak died in office while serving as Croatian Defence Minister and was awarded the rank posthumously in 1998.

See also
Croatian military ranks
Five-star rank

References

Military ranks of Croatia
Five-star officers